Plumcreek Township is a township in Armstrong County, Pennsylvania, United States. The population was 2,106 at the 2020 census, a decrease from the figure of 2,375 tabulated in 2010.

Geography
Plumcreek Township is located in southeastern Armstrong County, named for Plum Creek, a tributary of Crooked Creek and part of the Allegheny River watershed. The township surrounds the borough of Elderton.

Demographics

As of the census of 2000, there were 2,304 people, 877 households, and 678 families residing in the township.  The population density was 54.5 people per square mile (21.0/km).  There were 935 housing units at an average density of 22.1/sq mi (8.5/km).  The racial makeup of the township was 99.44% White, 0.09% African American, 0.09% Native American, 0.13% from other races, and 0.26% from two or more races. Hispanic or Latino of any race were 0.22% of the population.

There were 877 households, out of which 30.6% had children under the age of 18 living with them, 66.8% were married couples living together, 6.7% had a female householder with no husband present, and 22.6% were non-families. 18.8% of all households were made up of individuals, and 7.9% had someone living alone who was 65 years of age or older.  The average household size was 2.53 and the average family size was 2.88.

The township median age of 41 years was slightly more than the county median age of 40 years. The distribution by age group was 22.0% under the age of 18, 6.2% from 18 to 24, 28.3% from 25 to 44, 27.4% from 45 to 64, and 16.1% who were 65 years of age or older.  The median age was 41 years. For every 100 females, there were 102.1 males.  For every 100 females age 18 and over, there were 100.4 males.

The median income for a household in the township was $34,744, and the median income for a family was $39,559. Males had a median income of $28,802 versus $19,095 for females. The per capita income for the township was $14,624.  About 8.2% of families and 11.9% of the population were below the poverty line, including 17.6% of those under age 18 and 14.0% of those age 65 or over.

History
Plum Creek Township appears in the 1876 Atlas of Armstrong County, Pennsylvania. Its early history is detailed in Robert Walter Smith's 1883 History of Armstrong County.

Cemeteries
Gastown Cemetery
Mount Union Lutheran Church Cemetery
Rowley Cemetery
Whitesburg Presbyterian Cemetery
Whitesburg United Methodist Church Cemetery

References

Populated places established in 1788
Pittsburgh metropolitan area
Townships in Armstrong County, Pennsylvania
Townships in Pennsylvania
1788 establishments in Pennsylvania